The Monarch Mill Formation is a geologic formation in Nevada, United States. It preserves fossils dating back to the Neogene period.

See also

 List of fossiliferous stratigraphic units in Nevada
 Paleontology in Nevada

References

 

Neogene geology of Nevada